Edna May Davey (24 July 1909 – 2000), later Eaton, and then Hamilton, was an Australian freestyle swimmer. She competed in two events at the 1928 Summer Olympics.

In 1930 she married cricketer Ronald Eaton, but was divorced in 1934. She married Harry Hamilton in 1936. Their son, Graham Hamilton competed in the men's 4 × 200 metre freestyle relay at the 1956 Summer Olympics.

References

External links

1909 births
2000 deaths
Australian female freestyle swimmers
Olympic swimmers of Australia
Swimmers at the 1928 Summer Olympics
Sportspeople from London
20th-century Australian women